Anthony DeGrate (born November 15, 1973) is a former American college and professional football player who was a defensive tackle. He was drafted in the 7th round (209 pick overall) of the 1997 NFL Draft by the Tampa Bay Buccaneers. He never played a season in the National Football League (NFL).

Biography
DeGrate was born in Waco, Texas and played college football for Stephen F. Austin. He was unable to play football for two years while at Stephen F. Austin for academic reasons. He was drafted by the Tampa Bay Buccaneers in the 7th round of the 1997 draft and was waived by Tampa Bay in August 1998. He did not play a game in the NFL.

References

External links
 Yahoo! Sports: The Biggest Draft Day Blunders by the Tampa Bay Buccaneers: Fan Perspective
 Bucpower.com: The 1997 Buccaneer draft review

1973 births
Living people
Tampa Bay Buccaneers players
People from Waco, Texas
Stephen F. Austin Lumberjacks football players
Players of American football from Texas